The Chinese family name Mo (莫) is pronounced in Mandarin as "Mò" (4th tone), in Cantonese as "Mok6" (6th tone). The surname is often romanized as Mok where Cantonese speakers are prominent. According to a study of Mu Ying's Name record, the surname came to be when descendants of the antediluvian ruler Zhuanxu abbreviated the name of his city, Moyangcheng (莫陽城; in modern-day Pingxiang County, Hebei) and took it as their surname.

As Chinese family names go, Mo is relatively rare, ranked 168th in the Hundred Family Surnames. In 2004, there were an estimated 73,000 people with the surname of Mo abroad and 1,540,000 Mos in China.

When not used as a surname, 'Mo' (莫) means 'do not'.

Notable people

Arts and culture
Mo Yan (莫言), real name Guan Moye (管谟业), Chinese author, Nobel laureate
Max Mok Siu-Chung (莫少聰), Hong Kong actor
Hoyan Mok (莫可欣), winner of Miss Hong Kong Pageant (1993)
Karen Mok (莫文蔚), Hong Kong singer and actress.
Warren Mok (莫華倫), Hong Kong tenor
Mo Han (莫寒), Chinese singer, member of SNH48
Evelyn Mok, Chinese-Swedish-English comedian

Business
Charles Mok (莫乃光), Hong Kong internet entrepreneur

Production
Ken Mok, American television producer
May Mok (莫美華), Hong Kong sound editor
Tze Ming Mok (莫志明), New Zealand writer

Politics
Mo Xuanqing (莫宣卿), the youngest "number one scholar" (in the imperial examination) in Chinese history
Mo Teh-hui (莫德惠), Minister of Agricultural and Business (Republic of China)

Sports
Mo Huilan (莫慧兰), Chinese gymnast, silver medalist at the 1996 Olympic Games

See also
Mạc (surname)
 Chinese surname
 List of common Chinese surnames

Chinese-language surnames
Individual Chinese surnames